Kranti Assembly constituency was an assembly constituency in Jalpaiguri district in the Indian state of West Bengal.

Overview
As a consequence of the order of the Delimitation Commission Kranti Assembly constituency ceases to exist from 2011 and the new Dabgram-Phulbari Assembly constituency comes into being.

Members of Legislative Assembly

Results

1977-2006
In the 2006 state assembly elections, Fazlul Karim of CPI(M) won the Kranti assembly seat defeating his nearest rival Atul Roy, Independent. Contests in most years were multi cornered but only winners and runners are being mentioned. Sudhan Raha of CPI(M) defeated Aburabbani Ahmed (Badshah) of Trinamool Congress in 2001, Subhash Das of Congress in 1996, Aftabul Alam of Congress in 1991, and Kallol Basu of Congress in 1987. Parimal Mitra of CPI(M) defeated Deba Prasad Roy of Congress in 1982 and Abdul Hasnat Mohammed Abu Saleque of Congress in 1977. The constituency was not there prior to that.

References

Former assembly constituencies of West Bengal
Politics of Jalpaiguri district
1977 establishments in West Bengal
Constituencies established in 1977
Constituencies disestablished in 2011
2011 disestablishments in India